Admiral Philip Francis Tillard (17 September 1852 – 23 February 1933) was a Royal Navy officer.

References 

1852 births
1933 deaths
Royal Navy admirals
Place of birth missing
Place of death missing